King's Building or King's Buildings may refer to:

 Chater House, an office tower in Hong Kong
 King's Building, London, a Grade I listed building located in the Strand Campus of King's College London, England
 King's Buildings, a campus of the University of Edinburgh in Scotland